Rydal station is a station along the SEPTA West Trenton Line to Ewing, New Jersey. It is located at Susquehanna Road and Old Valley Road in the Rydal neighborhood of Abington Township, Pennsylvania. In FY 2013, Rydal station had a weekday average of 147 boardings and 138 alightings. The station has off-street parking and now houses a post office.

Rydal station was originally built in 1888 by the Reading Railroad, and is located on the north side of the tracks off of Susquehanna Road. An open sheltered shed can be found on Washington Lane, and the intersection of Washington Lane and Susquehanna Road can be found east of the shed beneath an 11'6" bridge under the tracks.

Station layout
Rydal has two low-level side platforms.

References

External links
SEPTA - Rydal Station
 Station from Google Maps Street View

SEPTA Regional Rail stations
Former Reading Company stations
Railway stations in the United States opened in 1888
Railway stations in Montgomery County, Pennsylvania